Aktion Gitter was the March 1939 arrest of thousands of anti-Nazi activists by the Gestapo in the Protectorate of Bohemia and Moravia based on lists that had been drawn up before the occupation by the Czechoslovak police.

Sources

March 1939 events
Protectorate of Bohemia and Moravia
1939 in Czechoslovakia